The Army Air Corps (AAC) is a component of the British Army, first formed in 1942 during the Second World War by grouping the various airborne units of the British Army. Today, there are eight regiments (seven Regular Army and one Reserve) of the AAC as well as four Independent Flights and two Independent Squadrons deployed in support of British Army operations around the world. Regiments and flights are located in the United Kingdom, Brunei, Canada, and Germany. Some AAC squadrons provide the air assault elements of 16 Air Assault Brigade through Joint Helicopter Command.

History

First formation: 1942–1949

The British Army first took to the sky during the 19th century with the use of observation balloons. In 1911 the Air Battalion of the Royal Engineers was the first heavier-than-air British military aviation unit. The following year, the battalion was expanded into the Military Wing of the Royal Flying Corps which saw action throughout most of the First World War until 1 April 1918, when it was merged with the Royal Naval Air Service to form the Royal Air Force. Between the wars, the army used RAF co-operation squadrons. At the beginning of the Second World War, Royal Artillery officers, with the assistance of RAF technicians, flew Auster observation aircraft under RAF-owned Air Observation Post (AOP) Squadrons. Twelve squadrons were raised, three of which belonged to the RCAF and each performed vital duties in many theatres.

In 1942, Winston Churchill announced the establishment of a new branch of army aviation, the Army Air Corps. The corps initially comprised the Glider Pilot Regiment and the Parachute Battalions (subsequently the Parachute Regiment), Air Landing Regiments, and the Air Observation Post Squadrons. In March 1944, the SAS Regiment was added to the corps.

Once the three gliders landed, some roughly which incurred casualties, the pilots joined the glider-borne troops (Ox & Bucks Light Infantry) to act as infantry. The bridge was taken within ten minutes of the battle commencing and the men withstood numerous attempts by the Germans to re-capture the location. They were soon reinforced and relieved by soldiers from the 1 Special Service Brigade (Lord Lovat). The AAC was disbanded in 1949, with the SAS regaining independent status, while the Parachute Regiment and Glider Pilot Regiment came under the umbrella of the Glider Pilot and Parachute Corps.

Second formation: 1957–present

In 1957 the Glider Pilot and Parachute Corps was split, with the Parachute Regiment becoming an independent formation, while the Glider Pilot Regiment was merged with the Air Observation Squadrons of the Royal Artillery into a new unit, the Army Air Corps.

In 1958 the Saunders-Roe Skeeter 7 was introduced as the AAC's first helicopter, it was replaced by the Aérospatiale Alouette II and Westland Scout AH.1 during the early 1960s. The de Havilland Canada DHC-2 Beaver AL.1 was introduced during the 1960s along with the Agusta/Westland Sioux AH.1 in 1964.

From 1970, nearly every army brigade had at least one Aviation Squadron that usually numbered twelve aircraft. The main rotor aircraft during the 1970s were the Westland Scout and Bell Sioux general purpose helicopters. The Sioux was replaced from 1973 by the Westland Gazelle used for Airborne reconnaissance; initially unarmed, they were converted to carry 68mm SNEB rocket pods in 1982, during the Falklands War. The Scout was replaced from 1978 by the Westland Lynx, which was capable of carrying additional firepower in the form of door gunners.

Basic rotary flying training was carried out on the Sioux in the 1970s, on the Gazelle in the 1980s and 1990s, and is currently conducted on the Eurocopter H145 through the Defence Helicopter Flying School.

Fixed-wing types in AAC service have included the Auster AOP.6 and AOP.9 and DHC-2 Beaver AL.1 in observation and liaison roles. In 1989, the AAC commenced operating a number of Britten-Norman Islander aircraft for surveillance and light transport duties. The corps operated the DHC-1 Chipmunk T.10 in a training role until its replacement by the Slingsby T67 Firefly in the 1990s. The Firefly was replaced by the Grob Tutor in 2010.

Cold War 
During the Cold War the majority of Army Air Corps units were based in Germany and part of the British Army of the Rhine. At the beginning of 1989 the Army Air Corps structure was as follows:
 Army Air Corps, AAC Middle Wallop

 1 Wing AAC, Hobart Barracks in Detmold, West Germany, under operational control of Commander Aviation 1st British Corps (Wing disbanded during 1989)
 1 Regiment AAC, Tofrek Barracks in Hildesheim, supported 1st Armoured Division
 651 Squadron AAC, (Anti-Tank, 4x Gazelle AH.1, 12x Lynx AH.7 (TOW))
 652 Squadron AAC, (Anti-Tank, 4x Gazelle AH.1, 12x Lynx AH.7 (TOW))
 661 Squadron AAC, (Reconnaissance, 12x Gazelle AH.1)
 3 Regiment AAC, Salamanca Barracks in Soest, supported 3rd Armoured Division
 653 Squadron AAC, (Anti-Tank, 4x Gazelle AH.1, 12x Lynx AH.7 (TOW))
 662 Squadron AAC, (Reconnaissance, 12x Gazelle AH.1)
 663 Squadron AAC, (Reconnaissance, 12x Gazelle AH.1)
 4 Regiment AAC, Hobart Barracks in Detmold, supported 4th Armoured Division
 654 Squadron AAC, (Anti-Tank, 4x Gazelle AH.1, 12x Lynx AH.7 (TOW))
 659 Squadron AAC, (Anti-Tank, 4x Gazelle AH.1, 12x Lynx AH.7 (TOW))
 669 Squadron AAC, (Reconnaissance, 12x Gazelle AH.1)
 2 Wing AAC, AAC Netheravon (Wing disbanded during 1989)
 Northern Ireland Regiment AAC, AAC Aldergrove (Later renamed 5 Regiment AAC)
 655 Squadron AAC, AAC Ballykelly, (Anti-Tank, 4x Gazelle AH.1, 12x Lynx AH.7), supported 2nd Infantry Division
 665 Squadron AAC, (16x Gazelle AH.1), supported HQ Northern Ireland
 1 Flight AAC, (Reconnaissance, 4x DHC-2 Beaver AOP)
 7 Regiment AAC, AAC Netheravon
 656 Squadron AAC, (Anti-Tank, 4x Gazelle AH.1, 12x Lynx AH.7), supported 1st Infantry Brigade
 666 Squadron AAC (V), (Territorial Army, Home Defence, 12x Gazelle AH.1)
 2 Flight AAC, (4x Gazelle AH.1), supported NATO's AMF(L)
 657 Squadron AAC, Colchester Garrison, (Anti-Tank, 4x Gazelle AH.1, 12x Lynx AH.7), supported 9th Infantry Brigade; joined 9 Regiment AAC in July 1990.
 9 Regiment AAC, RAF Topcliffe, part of 24th Airmobile Brigade
 672 Squadron AAC, (Lynx Light Battlefield Helicopter Squadron, activated 1 January 1990, 12x Lynx AH.9)
 3 Flight AAC, (4x Gazelle AH.1)
 School of Army Aviation, AAC Middle Wallop
 670 Squadron AAC, Middle Wallop, (Operational Training, 12x Gazelle AH.1, activated 1989)
 671 Squadron AAC, Middle Wallop, (Conversion to Type, 8x Gazelle AH.1, 8x Lynx AH.7)
 Trade Training School (Ground Crew & Maintenance Training)
 660 Squadron AAC, RAF Sek Kong, Hong Kong, (12x Scout AH.1), supported British Forces Hong Kong, two Scouts detached to British Forces Brunei
 C Flight, 660 Squadron AAC, Anduki Airfield in Seria, Brunei, (2x Scout AH.1)
 664 Squadron AAC, St George's Barracks in Minden, West Germany, (Reconnaissance, 12x Gazelle AH.1), supported 1st British Corps
 Development & Trials Squadron, AAC Middle Wallop, (12x Gazelle AH.1, under Director Army Air Corps. On 1 April 1990 renamed 667 (D&T) Squadron AAC)
 7 Flight AAC, RAF Gatow, Berlin, (4x Gazelle AH.1), supported the Berlin Infantry Brigade
 8 Flight AAC, Stirling Lines, Hereford, (4x A109A Hirundo), supported the Special Air Service
 12 Flight AAC, RAF Wildenrath, Germany, (4x Gazelle AH.1), supported British Army of the Rhine
 16 Flight AAC, Kingsfield Airfield in Dhekelia, Cyprus, (4x Gazelle AH.1) supported British Forces Cyprus
 25 Flight AAC, Price Barracks, Belize, (4x Gazelle AH.1), supported British Army Training and Support Unit Belize
 29 (BATUS) Flight AAC, CFB Suffield, Canada, (4x Gazelle AH.1), supported British Army Training Unit Suffield
 UNFICYP Flight AAC, Nicosia Airport, Cyprus, (4x Gazelle AH.1), supported United Nations Peacekeeping Force in Cyprus

War on Terror 
A further boost in the Army Air Corps' capability came in the form of the Westland Apache AH.1 attack helicopter, introduced in 2004. In 2006, British Apaches deployed to Afghanistan as part of the NATO International Security Assistance Force. In 2004, Britten-Norman Defender fixed wing aircraft were purchased for Afghanistan and Iraq.

End of fixed-wing flying, 2019–2021 
In April 2019, 651 Squadron personnel and aircraft, the Islander and Defender, were transferred from 5 Regiment to No. 1 Intelligence, Surveillance, and Reconnaissance Wing Royal Air Force. 651 Squadron continued to operate the aircraft until they were retired from service on 30 June 2021.

Current structure and deployment

Mascot 
The Army Air Corps adopted their first Corps Mascot – Zephyr, a bald eagle – in October 2011.

Training
The training of future Army Air Corps aircrew is delivered by the joint service UK Military Flying Training System. Elementary Flying Training was delivered at RAF Barkston Heath with 674 Squadron AAC, up until the Squadron’s standing down in April 2021.

Training Units, AAC Middle Wallop
 7 (Training) Regiment AAC

 671 Squadron – 'Lynx/Gazelle/Bell 212'j (Future uncertain, given retirement of Gazelle and Lynx fleets)
 673 Squadron – Apache Conversion to type
 No. 1 Flying Training School RAF, RAF Shawbury | Juno HT.1
 660 Squadron
 670 Squadron – Operational Training

Personnel 

The strength of the Army Air Corps is about 2,000 Regular personnel, of which 500 are officers. However, the AAC draws an additional 2,600 personnel from the Royal Logistic Corps, the Royal Electrical and Mechanical Engineers and the Adjutant General Corps. Therefore, total related Army Air Corps personnel is around 4,600.

Aircraft

Since 2019, the AAC solely operates rotary-wing aircraft in the operational environment. The AAC uses the same designation system for aircraft as the Royal Air Force and the Fleet Air Arm. The sole fixed-wing trainer is the Grob Tutor, used for Army Flying Grading.

Today AAC aviators fly five types of helicopter, and within each type there are usually several marks/variants which carry out different roles. Pilots train with No. 1 Flying Training School at RAF Shawbury. The School is a tri-Service organisation consisting of civilian and military instructors that take the student from basic flying through to more advanced flying such as instrument flying, navigation, formation flying and captaincy. In service aircraft include: the Bell 212HP AH1, the Eurocopter AS365N3 Dauphin II, the Airbus Helicopters H135 Juno, the Westland Gazelle AH1, the Westland Wildcat AH.1 and the AgustaWestland Apache AH1 which is being replaced by the Boeing AH-64E Version 6 Apache.

Command and units

Below is the current structure of the Army Air Corps as of 27 October 2021:
 1st Aviation Brigade
1 Regiment AAC, RNAS Yeovilton (AgustaWestland AW159 Wildcat)
 No. 651 Squadron
 No. 659 Squadron
 No. 661 Squadron
 No. 652 Squadron (OCU)
 5 Regiment AAC, Aldergrove (Aérospatiale Gazelle)
 No. 665 Squadron
No. 667 Squadron (Bell 212) [for administration], in Brunei (under British Forces Brunei)
No. 29 (BATUS) Flight [for administration], at CFB Suffield
3 Regiment AAC (AgustaWestland Apache and Boeing AH-64E Version 6 Apache)
No. 662 Squadron
No. 663 Squadron
4 Regiment AAC (AgustaWestland Apache)
No. 656 Squadron
No. 664 Squadron
No. 653 Squadron (Operational Conversion Unit for Apache)
6 Regiment AAC
RHQ/HQ Squadron, Bury St. Edmunds
 No. 675 (The Rifles) Squadron, Taunton/Yeovil
 No. 677 (Suffolk and Norfolk Yeomanry) Squadron, Bury St. Edmunds
 No. 678 (The Rifles) Squadron, Milton Keynes/Luton
 No. 679 (The Duke of Connaught's) Squadron, Portsmouth/Middle Wallop
 Aviation Specialist Group, Middle Wallop
Joint Special Forces Aviation Wing
 No. 658 Squadron (Eurocopter AS365 Dauphin), at Stirling Lines, Hereford

Independent units
 No. 660 Squadron (previously part of the Defence Helicopter Flying School, now part of No. 1 Flying Training School RAF)
 Army Flying Grading (previously the Initial Fixed Wing Flight)

Battle honours
The Army Air Corps is classed, in UK military parlance, as a "Combat Arm". It, therefore, carries its own guidon and is awarded battle honours. The honours awarded to the AAC are:
 Normandy Landings 1944
 Merville Battery 1944
 Rhine 1945
 North West Europe 1944 – 45
 Sicily 1943
 Pegasus Bridge
 Arnhem 1944
 Southern France
 Falkland Islands 1982
 Wadi al-Batin 1991
 Gulf 1991
 Al-Basrah
 Iraq 2003

Alliances
  – No. 16 Army Light Aircraft Squadron
  – Australian Army Aviation

Order of precedence

See also

 List of airfields of the Army Air Corps
 Museum of Army Flying
 List of Army Air Corps aircraft units
 Joint Helicopter Command
 Army aviation
 List of air forces

References

Bibliography

 Farrar-Hockley, General Sir Anthony. The Army in the Air: The History of the Army Air Corps. Stroud, Gloucestershire, UK: Alan Sutton Publishing Ltd., 1994. .

 Halley, James J. The Squadrons of the Royal Air Force & Commonwealth 1918–1988. Tonbridge, Kent, UK: Air Britain (Historians) Ltd., 1988. .
 Jefford, C.G. RAF Squadrons, a Comprehensive record of the Movement and Equipment of all RAF Squadrons and their Antecedents since 1912. Shrewsbury, Shropshire, UK: Airlife Publishing, 1988 (second edition 2001). .
 Mead, Peter. Soldiers in the Air: The Development of Army Flying. London: Ian Allan Ltd., 1967. 
 Parham Major General H.J. & Belfield E.M.G. Unarmed into Battle: The Story of the Air Observation Post. Warren & son, for the Air O.P. Officers' Association, Winchester, 1956. (Second edition: Chippenham, Wiltshire, UK: Picton Publishing Ltd., 1986. )
 Rawlings, John D.R. Coastal, Support and Special Squadrons of the RAF and their Aircraft. London: Jane's Publishing Company Ltd., 1982. .

External links 

 
 School of Army Aviation
 The Silver Eagles – Army Air Corps Freefall Parachute Display Team official webpage
 Army Air Corps group pool of images on Flickr
 Army Air Corps in Germany private webpage

 
Military units and formations established in 1942
1942 establishments in the United Kingdom
Army aviation
Army aviation units and formations